Koalang is a term coined by Janusz A. Zajdel, a Polish science fiction writer. It is a language used by people in a totalitarian world called Paradyzja in his 1984 novel of the same name. The "ko-al" in "koalang" derives from the Polish words 'kojarzeniowo-aluzyjny' ("associative-allusive").

Because Paradyzja is a space station, and activity is tracked by automatic cameras and analysed, mostly, by computers, its people created an Aesopian language, which is full of metaphors that are impossible for computers to grasp. The meaning of every sentence depended on the context. For example, "I dreamt about blue angels last night" means "I was visited by the police last night."

The software that analyzes sentences is self-learning. Thus, a phrase that is used to describe something metaphorically should not be used again in the same context.

Zajdel paid a tribute to George Orwell's newspeak and to Aldous Huxley, by naming one of the main characters Nikor Orley Huxwell.

In the 1980s, the youth magazine Na Przełaj (Short Cut) printed rock lyrics in a column titled KOALANG, hinting that the songs' texts contained content camouflaged from censorship.

See also
Darmok
Metaphorical language

References

Fictional languages
Polish science fiction
Janusz Zajdel
1984 neologisms
Fictional elements introduced in 1984